Giorgio Frezzolini (born 21 January 1976) is a retired Italian footballer who played as a goalkeeper.

Career
A Lazio youth system product, Frezzolini never played for the biancocelesti and was instead sent on loan to several minor league teams. In 1995, he was signed by Inter as a reserve choice, and then sent on loan to Serie C1 club Trapani in 1996, and Serie B side Fidelis Andria one year later. In November 1997 he was acquired by Udinese and managed to finally make his Serie A debut on 26 April 1998, in a league game against Roma. He was successively sent on loan again, this time to Cosenza, later in the summer of 1998, and spent the second half of the 1998–99 season on loan with A.C. Milan, who went on to win the Serie A title. After another spell on loan, this time with Chievo, in June 2001, he was sold to Lecce in a co-ownership deal, for 2,500 million lire (€1,291,142). In June 2002 Lecce acquired him outright for free.

From 2004 to 2009 he was first choice at Serie B club Modena, playing 176 games for the canarini. After a lacklustre season with Ascoli, Frezzolini joined Atalanta in 2010 as Andrea Consigli's backup.

He retired from professional football on 1 July 2015.

Notes

References

External links
gazzetta.it

1976 births
Living people
Footballers from Rome
Italian footballers
S.S. Lazio players
Inter Milan players
S.S. Fidelis Andria 1928 players
Udinese Calcio players
Cosenza Calcio 1914 players
A.C. Milan players
A.C. ChievoVerona players
U.S. Lecce players
Venezia F.C. players
Modena F.C. players
Ascoli Calcio 1898 F.C. players
Atalanta B.C. players
Serie A players
Serie B players
Association football goalkeepers